Let Freedom Ring: Winning the War of Liberty over Liberalism is a 2002 book by conservative political commentator and media personality Sean Hannity.

Summary 
According to the publisher, in the book "Hannity offers a survey of the world—political, social, and cultural—as he sees it." The book has been described as "an unapologetic diatribe against liberalism, questioning its logic and posing questions about the outcome of its agenda for Americans".

The book's publisher, ReganBooks, a division of HarperCollins, was owned by Rupert Murdoch, owner of Fox News.

References

External links 
 Let Freedom Ring: Winning the War of Liberty over Liberalism at Google Books

2002 non-fiction books
Books critical of modern liberalism in the United States
Books by Sean Hannity
ReganBooks books